Danika Holbrook-Harris (born September 15, 1972) is an American competitive rower. She competed at the 2004 Summer Olympics in Athens, in the women's quadruple sculls. She was born in Durham, New Hampshire.

She won a bronze medal at the 1993 World Rowing Championships, and a gold medal at the 1994 World Rowing Championships.

Her husband Ben Holbrook is also an Olympic rower.

References

1972 births
Living people
American female rowers
Olympic rowers of the United States
Rowers at the 2004 Summer Olympics
World Rowing Championships medalists for the United States
21st-century American women